Stone thrower may refer to:

Lithobolos
Stone throwing